Kameyevo (Kamay; , Kemej) is a rural locality (a village) and the administrative centre of Kameyevsky Selsoviet, Mishkinsky District, Bashkortostan, Russia. The population was 693 as of 2010. There are 15 streets.

Geography 
Kameyevo is located 13 km southeast of Mishkino (the district's administrative centre) by road. Russkoye Baybakovo is the nearest rural locality.

References 

Rural localities in Mishkinsky District